Wentlooge, sometimes known as Wentloog, is a community in the southwest of the city of Newport, South Wales, in the Marshfield ward. The community includes Peterstone Wentloodge and St. Brides Wentloodge and in 2011 had a population of 737.

Description
The name Wentlooge is a corruption of the earlier name Gwynllŵg, said to have been named after Gwynllyw, its 5th - 6th century ruler.

The community is bounded by Percoed reen to the northwest, the Ebbw River to the northeast, the Bristol Channel to the southeast and the South Wales Main Line to the southwest. It contains the hamlets of St Brides Wentloog and Peterstone Wentloog.

The West Usk Lighthouse is built on the shore of the Bristol Channel in the far east of the community.

Government 
The area is governed by the Newport City Council and the Wentlooge community council.

Commercial development
Located between Cardiff and Newport, and in a non-protected but designated green belt to allow for definition between the two cities, the area has been subjected to a series of planned light industrial developments. These include warehouses and other facilities, including a rail freight container terminal operated by Freightliner Group.

See also
Wentloog hundred

References

External links

Wentlooge Community Council website

Communities in Newport, Wales